Dungeons is a strategy/simulation video game developed by Realmforge Studios and published by Kalypso Media. It was announced August 12, 2010, and was released on January 27, 2011, in Germany and February 10, 2011, in North America.

Gameplay
Although similar to the Dungeon Keeper series, Dungeons differs in that the purpose is to care for heroes and not monsters. In order to gain the Soul Energy needed to purchase high-end equipment for the dungeon, heroes need to be killed only after they are fully satisfied. Heroes are pleased if they, for example, find treasure or fight challenging, but not overpowering opponents. Unlike Dungeon Keeper, the player also has an on screen avatar, the Dungeon Lord, who can teleport bodies to the prison room to have their Soul Energy harvested or roam the dungeon defeating heroes. He will re-spawn at the dungeon heart if he is slain, at the cost of the dungeon heart's health points.

Reception

Dungeons received "mixed or average" reviews according to review aggregator Metacritic. Critics noted that the game was more about taking care of the heroes rather than your own creatures, in contrast to the Dungeon Keeper series. However, GameSpot panned the game as having "mind-numbing, repetitive gameplay."

Addon 
A standalone addon called "Dungeons - The Dark Lord" was released in September 2011.

Sequels 
A sequel Dungeons 2 was announced as an easter egg in DARK in July 2013. It was released on April 24, 2015, for Microsoft Windows, OS X and SteamOS.

Dungeons 3 is the sequel to Dungeons 2. It was released on October 13, 2017.

See also
Dungeon Keeper

References

External links
 Dungeons-Game.com
 Review: Strategy Informer gives Dungeons 8.5/10

2011 video games
Games for Windows certified games
Lua (programming language)-scripted video games
Simulation video games
Strategy video games
Fantasy video games
Video games developed in Germany
Windows games
Windows-only games
Dungeon management games